Paol Keineg (born February 6, 1944) is a Breton-American writer and poet born in Quimerc'h (Brittany).

He worked in several places in Brittany as a supervisor before becoming a teacher in Morlaix. He was fired without any official reason in 1972, because of his political separatist leftist Breton points of view. He set up his first plays in 1973 :  Le Printemps des Bonnets Rouges (The spring of the red hats) about an historical revolt in Brittany.

In the mid-1970s he moved to California, where he worked illegally as a welder without a green card. In 1977, he put his name down for Brown University, where he graduated with a Ph.D. in 1981. He taught French and literature in Dartmouth College, Brown University, and is now in Duke University, after being invited to teach in Berkeley and Harvard universities.

In 1983, he created the review called "Poésie-Bretagne" (Poetry-Brittany). He writes his books in Breton, French and English languages.

He is the father of Katell Keineg.

Books
"Un enterrement dans l'île" (in French), translations of Hugh MacDiarmid, Les Hauts Fonds, 2016
Qui? (in French), translations of R.S. Thomas with Marie-Thérèse Castay and Jean-Yves Le Disez, Les Hauts Fonds, 2015
Mauvaises langues (in French), Obsidiane, 2014
Histoires vraies/Mojennoù gwir/Histórias verícas (in Portuguese), translations by Ruy Proença, Dobra Editorial, 2014
Abalamour (in Breton and French), drawings by François Dilasser, Les Hauts Fonds, 2012
Les trucs sont démolis (in French), Le Temps qu'il fait/Obsidiane, 2008
"Wiersze Bretonskie" (in Polish), translations by Kazimierz Brakoniecki, Olsztyn/Centrum Polsko-Francuskie, 2007
Là et pas là (in French), Le temps qu'il fait/Lettres sur cour, 2005
Terre lointaine (in French), Éditions Apogée, 2004
Triste Tristan, suivi de Diglossie, j'y serre mes glosses (in French), Éditions Apogée, 2003
Anna Zero (in French), Éditions Apogée, 2002
Dieu et madame Lagadec (in French), Scorff's editions, 2001
A Cournille (in French), Dana editions, 1999
Tohu (in English), Wigwam editions, 1995
Silva return, Maurice Nodeau and Guernica (in English) (Montreal), 1989
Oiseaux de Bretagne, oiseaux d'Amérique (in French), Obsidiane, 1984
Préfaces au Gododdin (in French), Bretagnes editions, 1981
Boudica, Taliesin et autres poèmes (in French), Maurice Nadeau, 1980
35 haiku (in Breton), Bretagne editions, 1978
Lieux communs, suivi de Dahut (in French), Gallimard editions, 1974 (won Prix Fénéon, 1974)
Histoires vraies/Mojennoù gwir (in French and Breton), P.J. Oswald, 1974
Le printemps des Bonnets Rouges (in French), P.J. Oswald, 1972
Chroniques et croquis des villages verrouillés (in French), P.J. Oswald, 1971
Hommes liges des talus en transes (in French), P.J. Oswald, 1969
Le poème du pays qui a faim (in French), Traces, 1967, Bretagne editions, 1982

Plays

His all playwriting has been written in French.

Le printemps des Bonnets Rouges, Théâtre de la Tempête, directed by Jean-Marie Serreau, December  1972- January 1973.
(Manque d')aventures en Pathogénie, France-Culture, directed by Jean Taromi, 1983.
La Reine de la nuit, Théâtre du Miroir, Châteaulin, Finistère, 1992.
Kaka, ou l'Entrevue céleste, in La Nuit des naissances, Théâtre de Folle Pensée, Saint-Brieuc, 1994.
Anna Zéro. Gwengolo (Tombées de la nuit), directed by Michel Jestin, Rennes, 2002.
Terre lointaine, Théâtre de Folle Pensée, directed by Annie Lucas, Quimper, 2004.

See also

Breton American

References

1944 births
Living people
French poets
Writers from Brittany
American people of Breton descent
French male poets
Breton-language poets
Breton Democratic Union politicians
International Writing Program alumni
Prix Fénéon winners
University of Western Brittany alumni
Brown University alumni